Allister de Winter (born 12 March 1968) is an Australian retired first class cricketer who played for the Tasmanian Tigers from 1986 until 1993. Following his retirement, de Winter pursued a career as a junior development coach. In 2002 he coached the Tasmanian Tigers under-19 side, alongside fellow former Tigers player Michael Farrell. In 2003 the Western Australian Cricket Association employed de Winter as a state development coach. In 2005 de Winter moved to Bangladesh, to take up the position as head coach of the Bangladesh National Cricket Academy and coach of the under-19 Bangladesh cricket team, taking them to a 5th place at the 2006 ICC under-19 World Cup. He is currently the Assistant Coach of the Tasmanian Tigers, a position he has held since the 2007–08 season.

References

External links
 

1968 births
Living people
Australian cricket coaches
Australian cricketers
Big Bash League coaches
Cricketers from Launceston, Tasmania
Tasmania cricketers